Zinc finger MYND domain-containing protein 10 is a protein that in humans is encoded by the ZMYND10 gene.

References

Further reading